WOW Hits 2006 is a two-disc compilation album of songs that have been touted to represent the best of Christian music of 2005.  It was released on October 4, 2005.  It includes thirty songs plus three bonus cuts.  The album features songs by Jeremy Camp, Casting Crowns, MercyMe, Third Day, and many more well known groups and singers. The album peaked at No. 42 on the Billboard 200 chart.  It was certified as platinum in sales in 2006 by the Recording Industry Association of America (RIAA).

Track listing

Charts

Weekly charts

Year-end charts

See also
 WOW Hits

References

External links
 WOW Hits official website
 Find all the WOW HITS
 WOW Hits online

2005 compilation albums
WOW series albums
WOW Hits albums